Kate Badoe is a Ghanaian artist born in 1962. Her work, "Combs of Akuaba Dolls," was sold at Arthouse Contemporary Limited in 2013 for 2,237 USD. She currently lives in Vancouver.

Exhibition 
Badoe's work "From the Royal Household" has been exhibited through the Tasneem Gallery, while "Faces of Ceremony" and "Combs of Akuaba Dolls" have also been exhibited at auction. She has presented designs with cowries and raffia at the Loom Art Gallery.

Works 
Her work creates complex patterns by combining African art images with geometry. She also creates ink drawings.

References

Living people
1962 births
20th-century Ghanaian artists
Artists from Vancouver